Alexander Stuart Murray, FBA (8 January 1841March, 1904) was a Scottish archaeologist. He was known for excavations on Cyprus.

Life
Murray was born at Arbroath, and educated there, at the Royal High School, Edinburgh and at the Universities of Edinburgh and Berlin. In 1867 he entered the British Museum as an assistant in the department of Greek and Roman antiquities under Sir Charles Newton, whom he succeeded in 1886. His younger brother, George Robert Milne Murray (1858–1911), was made keeper of the botanical department in 1895, a  rare instance of two brothers becoming heads of departments at the museum.

In 1873 Murray published a Manual of Mythology, and in the following year contributed to the Contemporary Review two articles—one on the Homeric question—which led to a friendship with Mr Gladstone, the other on Greek painters. In 1874 he also published the popular work Who's Who in Mythology.  In 1880-1883 he brought out his History of Greek Sculpture: From the Earliest Times Down to the Age of Pheidias, which at once became a standard work. In 1886, he was selected by the Society of Antiquaries of Scotland to deliver the next year's Rhind lectures on archaeology, out of which grew his Handbook of Greek Archaeology (1892).

In 1894-1896 Murray directed excavations in Cyprus including those at Enkomi; they were undertaken by means of a bequest of £2000 from Miss Emma Tournour Turner. The objects obtained are described and illustrated in Excavations in Cyprus, published by the trustees of the museum in 1900. Murray's other official publications include three folio volumes on Terra-cotta Sarcophagi, White Athenian Vases and Designs from Greek Vases. In 1898 he wrote for the Portfolio a monograph on Greek bronzes, founded on lectures delivered at the Royal Academy in that year, and he contributed many articles on archaeology to standard publications.

In recognition of his services to archaeology he was made LL.D. of Glasgow University in 1887 and elected a corresponding member of the Berlin Academy of Sciences in 1900.

Works
 Manual of Mythology (1873)
 Who's Who in Mythology: A Classic Guide to the Ancient World (1874) 
Two Vases from Cyprus (1887)
Excavations in Cyprus: bequest of Miss E. T. Turner to the British Museum (1900)

References

External links
 

1841 births
1904 deaths
19th-century Scottish people
People from Arbroath
People educated at the Royal High School, Edinburgh
Alumni of the University of Edinburgh
Humboldt University of Berlin alumni
Scottish archaeologists
Employees of the British Museum
Fellows of the British Academy